The Skagit River Hydroelectric Project is a series of dams with hydroelectric power-generating stations on the Skagit River in northern Washington State. The project is owned and operated by Seattle City Light to provide electric power for the City of Seattle and surrounding communities.

In 2012, hydro-electric dams provided approximately 89.8 percent of the electricity used in Seattle. The Skagit Hydroelectric Project alone accounts for about 20 percent of Seattle City Light's electricity.

History 
In 1917, James Delmage Ross, superintendent of lighting for Seattle, obtained approval from the Department of Agriculture to build dams on the Skagit River. The city council approved $1.5 million in bonds for construction and appointed Carl F. Uhden as the project superintendent. The construction camp was set up at the mouth of Newhalem Creek, giving the unincorporated community its name.

Uhden hired contractors to built a 25-mile rail line to Gorge Creek, allowing Seattle City Light to control access to the area. After the railroad reached the site above Newhalem, a two-mile tunnel was dug between the dam and the powerhouse. Work was frequently delayed by floods, mudslides, and avalanches. The schedule was further delayed by workers leaving to hunt for gold, labor troubles, a forest fire, and a shortage of electricity. Although Ross had estimated that the Skagit River operation would provide electricity to Seattle by 1921, those various delays pushed the date to 1924.

The Gorge Dam generators were formally started by President Calvin Coolidge on September 17, 1924.

In August 2021 Seattle City Light announced that it will undertake a study of the possibility of removing one or more of the Skagit dams for environmental reasons.

Dams 

The three major dams in the Skagit River Project are (from lower to upper) Gorge Dam, Diablo Dam, and Ross Dam. The dams are located in Whatcom County above the town of Newhalem, which lies just west of North Cascades National Park. Ross Lake, formed by Ross Dam extends into British Columbia, which is 20 miles upriver from the dam. Ross Lake National Recreation Area surrounds the lake.

Construction of Gorge Dam  began in 1921 and the first power was delivered to Seattle in 1924. The cost of the dam was $13 million ($153,339,181 in 2006 dollars). In 1961 a new Gorge High Dam was completed ( to replace the original Gorge Dam.
This dam was featured in Alan Pakula's 1974 thriller The Parallax View, starring Warren Beatty.

Construction of Diablo Dam  was begun in 1927, five miles upstream from Gorge Dam. Diablo Dam was completed in 1930, and at that time was the tallest dam in the world at  until Owyhee Dam was built. Although the dam was complete, financial problems due to the Great Depression delayed building the powerhouse, so the dam produced no electricity for Seattle until 1936.

Construction of Ruby Dam  at the Rip Raps below Ruby Creek began in 1937. This dam was renamed Ross Dam after the death of James Delmage Ross (1872–1939), the superintendent of the Skagit River Project. Construction of Ross Dam was to take place in three stages and the first stage was completed in 1940.

All three dams are listed in the National Register of Historic Places. The total cost of the Skagit River Hydroelectric Project was $250 million over 50 years.

Hydroelectric power capacity

Tourism 
From 1928 until the start of World War II, City Light offered guided tours of the Skagit Project. From Rockport, visitors rode City Light's steam locomotive 23 miles to Newhalem. Dormitories were provided, as were meals in The Gorge Inn. The next day, visitors boarded another train to Diablo, where they toured the powerhouse and rode an incline lift to the top of the dam. Next, they rode a barge or tour boat to Ruby Creek, then returned to Rockport. Over 100,000 people visited the Skagit Project by 1941. After the war, shortened tours resumed.

Current tours sponsored by City Light include a boat tour, a walking tour, and a combination walking-and-van tour.

References

Sources

Historylink.org
Seattle City Light Skagit Tours
 Larry Kunzler Historical Record of Dam Building and their Impacts on Floods of the Skagit River: 1924 through 1968
Guide to the Seattle City Light Gorge Development Project Photographs and Photograph Albums 1948-1962
Guide to the Seattle City Light Skagit Project: Diablo Dam Construction Photograph Albums 1919-1936
Guide to the Seattle City Light Ross Dam Photograph Albums 1938-1948
Guide to the Seattle City Light Skagit Youth Camp Records 1991-1996
Nearby construction era photo, as the Ross Dam was being completed in 1956
Tour boat on the lake formed by the Diablo Dam, during the construction era
Construction photo of what became Ross Dam

External links

Seattle Power and Water Supply Collection, images of Skagit River Hydroelectric Project - University of Washington Digital Collection
Historic American Engineering Record (HAER) documentation, filed under Newhalem, Whatcom County, WA:

Dams in Washington (state)
Historic American Engineering Record in Washington (state)
Seattle City Light dams
United States power company dams
Hydroelectric power plants in Washington (state)
Buildings and structures in Whatcom County, Washington
Industrial buildings and structures on the National Register of Historic Places in Washington (state)
Energy infrastructure on the National Register of Historic Places
Historic districts on the National Register of Historic Places in Washington (state)
National Register of Historic Places in Whatcom County, Washington